Radhika is an Indian actress who appears mainly in Malayalam films,she is best known for portraying Rasiya in the 2006 Malayalam film Classmates.

Biography

She became popular by the character Razia in director Lal Jose's blockbuster movie Classmates.

Personal life

Radhika got engaged to Dubai-based Abhil Krishna on 27 December  2016, and they were married on 12 February 2017.

Filmography

Musical albums

References

External links 
 
 OneIndia article
 Cinespot article

People from Alappuzha district
Actresses from Kerala
Living people
Actresses in Malayalam cinema
Indian film actresses
Year of birth missing (living people)
20th-century Indian actresses
21st-century Indian actresses
Actresses in Malayalam television
Actresses in Tamil cinema